Mauro Zuliani (born 23 July 1959 in Milan) is a former Italian sprinter who specialized in the 400 metres.

Biography
He won four medals at the International athletics competitions, three of these with national relays team. He participated at two editions of the Summer Olympics (1980 and 1984), he has 38 caps in national team from 1978 to 1987.

He won a bronze medal in the 4 x 400 metres relay at the 1980 Summer Olympics, with teammates Stefano Malinverni, Roberto Tozzi and Pietro Mennea. His personal best time is 45.26 seconds, achieved in September 1981 at the World Cup in Rome.

Achievements

National titles
He has won 3 times the individual national championship.
1 win in the 100 metres (1979)
3 wins in the 400 metres (1981, 1982, 1986)

See also
 Italian all-time lists - 400 metres
 Italy national relay team

References

External links
 }

1959 births
Living people
Italian male sprinters
Athletes (track and field) at the 1980 Summer Olympics
Athletes (track and field) at the 1984 Summer Olympics
Olympic bronze medalists for Italy
Olympic athletes of Italy
Athletes from Milan
World Athletics Championships athletes for Italy
Athletics competitors of Fiamme Oro
Olympic bronze medalists in athletics (track and field)
Mediterranean Games silver medalists for Italy
Mediterranean Games medalists in athletics
Athletes (track and field) at the 1983 Mediterranean Games
Medalists at the 1980 Summer Olympics
Italian Athletics Championships winners
20th-century Italian people